The following list indicates the best-selling albums from 1980 to 1989 on the Japanese Oricon chart. It is based on cumulative sales figures of three formats (on vinyl, audio cassette, and compact discs).

Albums

References

Japan
1980s in Japanese music